Cvetež (in older sources also Cveteš) is a former settlement in the Municipality of Moravče in central Slovenia. It is now part of the village of Dešen. The area is part of the traditional region of Upper Carniola. The municipality is now included in the Central Slovenia Statistical Region.

Geography
Cvetež lies in the eastern part of the village of Dešen, below the southeast slope of Slivna Hill.

History
Cvetež was annexed by Dešen in 1952, ending its existence as an independent settlement.

References

External links

Cvetež on Geopedia

Populated places in the Municipality of Moravče
Former settlements in Slovenia